Cerovac may refer to:


Bosnia and Herzegovina
 Cerovac, Tešanj
 Cerovac, Trebinje

Croatia
 Cerovac Barilovićki, a village near Barilović
 Cerovac, Osijek-Baranja County, a village near Bizovac
 Cerovac, Požega-Slavonia County, a village near Jakšić
 Cerovac, Zadar County, a village near Gračac

Serbia
Cerovac (Kragujevac), a village in Šumadija District
Cerovac (Šabac), a village in Mačva District
Cerovac (Smederevska Palanka), a village in Podunavlje District

See also 
 Cerovac Vukmanićki, a village near Karlovac, Croatia
 Cerovo (disambiguation)